The ARIA Achievement Awards and ARIA Icon Awards, are awards presented periodically at the annual ARIA Music Awards, which recognise "the many achievements of Aussie artists across all music genres", and are "awarded at the discretion of the ARIA Board." They are handed out by the Australian Recording Industry Association (ARIA), an organisation whose aim is "to advance the interests of the Australian record industry." The awards listed below are given periodically to Australian-based artists or industry personnel within the categories: ARIA Outstanding Achievement Awards (first presented in 1988), ARIA Special Achievement Awards (first in 1989), ARIA Lifetime Achievement Awards (first in 1991) and ARIA Icon Awards (first in 2013).

Awardees

Outstanding Achievement 

In the following table, the awardee is highlighted in colour, and in boldface.

Special Achievement 

In the following table, the awardee is highlighted in colour, and in boldface.

Lifetime Achievement 

In the following table, the awardee is highlighted in colour, and in boldface.

Icon Awards 

In the following table, the awardee is highlighted in colour, and in boldface.

Notes

References

External links
The ARIA Awards Official website

ARIA Music Awards